The 37th Venice Biennale, held in 1976, was an exhibition of international contemporary art, with 30 participating nations. The Venice Biennale takes place biennially in Venice, Italy. No prizes were awarded this year or in any Biennale between 1968 and 1986.

References

Bibliography

Further reading 

 
 
 
 
 
 
 
 
 
 
 
 
 
 
 
 
 
 
 
 
 
 
 
 
 
 
 
 
 
 

1976 in art
1976 in Italy
Venice Biennale exhibitions